Ambartsumian, Ambartsumyan, Hambardzumyan, Hambardzumian, Hambartsumyan or Hambartsumian is an Armenian surname. In Armenian onomasticst, it is a religious surname derived from 'Hambardzum' meaning Ascension of Jesus. The suffix '-yan' denotes surname (all Armenian surnames end in -ian or -yan with a few exceptions). The variants beginning without H (Ambartsoumian, Ambartsumian, Ambartsumyan, etc) originated in the USSR as Russian lacks the sound H.
Notable people with this last name include :
 Armen Ambartsumyan (born 1978), Bulgarian-Armenian footballer
David Hambartsumyan (1956–1992), Armenian diver
Eduard Hambardzumyan (born 1986), Armenian boxer
 Grigori Ambartsumyan (1933–2014), Soviet footballer and coach
Hovhannes Hambardzumyan (born 1990), Armenian footballer
 Levon Ambartsumian (born 1955), Armenian violinist and conductor
Sergo Hambardzumyan (1910–1983), Armenian weightlifter
 Viktor Ambartsumian (1908–1996), Soviet Armenian astronomer and astrophysicist
 Vyacheslav Ambartsumyan (1940–2008), Soviet international footballer

Armenian-language surnames